William Charles Farmer  (February 27, 1864 – February 9, 1928) was a professional baseball player who played catcher in the major leagues in 1888 Pittsburgh Alleghenys of the National League and the Philadelphia Athletics of the American Association. He later played for the St. Paul Apostles of the Western Association in 1889 and 1890.

External links

1864 births
1928 deaths
Pittsburgh Alleghenys players
Philadelphia Athletics (AA) players
Major League Baseball catchers
Baseball players from Pennsylvania
19th-century baseball players
Oswego Starchboxes players
Shamokin Maroons players
St. Paul Apostles players